Patrik Koch (born December 8, 1996) is a Slovak professional ice hockey player. He is currently playing for HC Vítkovice Ridera of the Czech Extraliga.

Career
Koch made his Czech Extraliga debut playing with HC Kometa Brno during the 2015-16 Czech Extraliga season.

Career statistics

Regular season and playoffs

International

References

External links

1996 births
Living people
Des Moines Buccaneers players
SK Horácká Slavia Třebíč players
HC Kometa Brno players
HC Košice players
HC Prešov players
HC Vítkovice players
Slovak ice hockey defencemen
Ice hockey people from Bratislava
Slovak expatriate ice hockey players in the Czech Republic
Slovak expatriate ice hockey players in the United States
Slovak expatriate sportspeople in Austria
Expatriate ice hockey players in Austria